This is a list of Ukrainian football transfers in the winter transfer window 2010–2011 by club. Only transfers of the Premier League are included.

Premier League

FC Arsenal Kyiv

In:
 

Out:

FC Dnipro Dnipropetrovsk

In:

Out:

FC Dynamo Kyiv

In:
 

Out:

FC Illichivets Mariupol

In:
 

Out:

FC Karpaty Lviv

In:

Out:

FC Kryvbas Kryvyi Rih

In:

Out:

FC Metalist Kharkiv

In:

Out:

FC Metalurh Donetsk

In:

Out:

FC Metalurh Zaporizhya

In:
 

 
Out:

FC Obolon Kyiv

In:
 

Out:

FC Sevastopol

In:
 

Out:

FC Shakhtar Donetsk

In:
 

Out:

SC Tavriya Simferopol

In:
 

Out:

FC Volyn Lutsk

In:
 

Out:

FC Vorskla Poltava

In:

Out:

FC Zorya Luhansk

In:

Out:

See also
2010–11 Ukrainian Premier League

References

External links
 Ukrainian Football Premier League- official site
 Professional football league of Ukraine – official site
 Football Federation of Ukraine  – official site
 Ukrainian Soccer Fan Club (ukrainiansoccer.net) – amateur's site
 Премьер-лига. Трансферная зима-2010/2011 (Premier-league. Transfer winter 2010/11)

Ukrainian
Transfers
2010-11